Anwar Hajher is an Afghan American filmmaker. After leaving Afghanistan during the Russian invasion, he traveled around the world and settled in the United States. In 2008 he directed 16 Days in Afghanistan a documentary about life after the Taliban.

External links
 Biography 
 Amazon

American film directors
Living people
American people of Afghan descent
Afghan documentary filmmakers
Year of birth missing (living people)
American film directors of Asian descent